Hochsauerlandkreis (meaning “High Sauerland District” in German) is a Kreis (district) in the east of North Rhine-Westphalia, Germany. Neighboring districts are Soest, Paderborn, Höxter, Waldeck-Frankenberg, Siegen-Wittgenstein, Olpe, Märkischer Kreis.

The district is named “High Sauerland” because two of the highest mountains of the Sauerland mountainous landscape, Langenberg and Kahler Asten are in its territory. With 2,766 ft / 843 m (Langenberg) and 2,762 ft / 842 m (Kahler Asten) these are also the highest mountains of North Rhine-Westphalia.

History 
The district was established in 1975 in the reorganization of the districts in North Rhine-Westphalia by merging the previous districts Arnsberg, Brilon and Meschede.

Geography 
Geographically the district covers a big part of the Sauerland mountains, including the highest and third highest elevation – the Langenberg near Olsberg with 2,766 ft / 843 m, and the better known Kahler Asten with 2,762 ft / 842 m near Winterberg. These are also the two highest mountains of North Rhine-Westphalia.

Coat of arms 
The coat of arms was inherited from the former district Arnsberg. It shows the eagle as the symbol of the Earls of Arnsberg. When their county lost independence in 1368 it fell to the bishops of Cologne, thus the sign on the breast of the eagle shows the Cologne cross.

Towns and municipalities

Town twinnings 
Hochsauerland is twinned with the following cities:

  West Lothian, Scotland

Notable persons
Franz Hoffmeister (died 1943), Roman Catholic priest

Notable places
Abbey Bergkloster, Bestwig 
Abbey Grafschaft, Schmallenberg
Abbey Königsmünster, Meschede

References

External links 

  
 Touristic website 

 
Districts of North Rhine-Westphalia
Sauerland
1975 establishments in West Germany